Ceretic may refer to:

Ceretic of Alt Clut, 5th-century king in Scotland
Ceretic of Elmet (died 617), early king in northern England

See also
Cerdic of Wessex (died 534), king in southwest England
Cedric (disambiguation)